Panther Wildlife Management Area, located along Panther Creek in southwestern McDowell County, West Virginia.

References

External links 
 

West Virginia state forests
Protected areas of McDowell County, West Virginia